Pyotr Nikolaevich Kolbasin  (born 20 June 1942, Moscow, USSR) is an actor, director, producer, screenwriter, teacher of acting, journalist. Honorary Cinematographer of the Russian Federation.

Biography 
Kolbasin was born on 20 June 1942 in Moscow.

He made his debut in cinema in 1969 in a short film by Andrei Razumovsky The fifth day of the autumn exhibition. This was followed by a small role in the sensational Italian-Soviet film project Sunflowers famous Vittorio De Sica. In 1976 he graduated from the Directing Course Oleg Yefremov in the Moscow Art Theater School.

Movie a career largely remained unrealized as at the end of the Studio School Kolbasin was sent to regional theaters (Ordzhonikidze, Rostov-na-Donu, Kuibyshev, Kalinin, Yakutsk, Biysk).

In 1985, the direction of the  Ministry of Culture of the RSFSR came to work in Yakutsk in the Russian Drama Theatre. Thanks to the initiative Kolbasina Yakutia has received the youth theater studio. As a radio journalist created and led a number of cognitive and comedy programs. He was director of radio plays. As an operator and director has produced 73 TV copyright,  number of stories on the Channel One Russia and All-Russia State Television and Radio Broadcasting Company.

In 2002, he acted as the director of the film of Sergei Yesenin  Life-long Song With...  commissioned by the Russian State Committee for Cinematography of the Russian Federation Ministry of Culture.

Member of the organizing committee of the first film festival in Yakutia  Sun Horse  (2003).

Filmography 
 1969:   The Fifth Day of the Autumn Exhibition (short film)
1970: Sunflower  as  episode (uncredited)
 1970:   Calling You Taimyr as accompanist
1970:   The Love for Three Oranges as painter
 1971: Trial on the Road as  episode (uncredited)
1972:   The Last Day as policeman
1973:   Siberian Grandfather as revolutionary Postyshev
1980:   There, Behind the Seven Mountains
 1982: The Train Has Stopped as  Valery Gubkin, assistant driver’s
 1983:   This Cruel Game   Hockey as Gennady Stepanovich
1984:   Planet Parade as tankman
1985:   On Paycheck to Paycheck as Gera
1986:   Mikhail Lomonosov (3 Series) as  episode 
 1987: The Garden of Desires as Ivan
 2003: Black Mask (last role)

References

External links
 
    Pyotr Kolbasin  on KinoPoisk
 Пётр Николаевич Колбасин 

1942 births
Living people
Male actors from Moscow
Soviet male film actors
Soviet male stage actors
Russian male film actors
Russian male stage actors
20th-century Russian male actors
21st-century Russian male actors